Mugulü was a legendary warrior and chieftain in the Mongolian Plateau during the period when it was under the rule of tribes and peoples originating from the fragmentation of the failed and crumbling Xianbei confederation. The term "Mongol" is a likely derivation from his name.

Biography 
Mugulü was likely born before AD 277, at the end of Tuoba Liwei's reign.

Little is known about his childhood. His date and place of birth, and the names of his parents or those of his consorts, are not disclosed in Book of Wei.

He served in the Xianbei army under the leadership of the Tuoba tribal chief, Tuoba Yilu (295–316) of Dai. Possibly a legendary figure, he was a Xianbei slave according to Chinese sources, though this anecdote has been rejected by modern scholars.

Youth 
According to Chinese chronicles, Mugulü was an enslaved Xianbei of unknown origin who was captured and enslaved by a Tuoba raider cavalryman during the reign of chief Liwei (220-277) of the Tuoba, a Xianbei clan most likely of Proto-Mongolic origin. The anecdote of his enslaved status has been rejected by modern scholars as "a typical insertion by the Chinese historians intended to show the low birth and barbarian nature of the northern nomads."

Mugulü's career and his escape through the Gobi 
According to the Book of Wei, after either having matured (being 30 or older) or because of his strength, Mugulü was emancipated and became a warrior in the Tuoba Xianbei cavalry, under the leadership of Tuoba Yilu of Dai (307–316). However, he tarried past the deadline and was sentenced to death by beheading. He vanished and hid in the Gobi desert, but then gathered a hundred or more other escapees. They sought refuge under a neighboring tribe of Tiele people called Hetulin (紇突隣).

It is not known when Mugulü died; sources say 316 AD.

Family and succession 
When Mugulü died, his son Yujiulü Cheluhui acquired his own tribal horde and either Cheluhui was or his tribe called themselves Rouran. Cheluhui's government was marked by [nomadism and peace, but they remained subjects to the Xianbei Tuobas.

His descendants and successors were:

Yujiulü Cheluhui, son
Yujiulü Tunugui, grandson 
Yujiulü Bati, great-grandson
Yujiulü Disuyuan, great-great-grandson

Personal name 

According to the Chinese chronicles, the Xianbei (Sianbi) master called the captive Mugulü, a Xianbei word glossed as "bald-headed" (首禿) possibly owing to his appearances, his hairline starting at his eyebrow's level, and because he did not remember his name and surname. This was reconstructed as Mongolic Muqur (Mukhur) or Muquli (Mukhuli) presumably "round, smooth" by Japanese researcher Shiratori Kurakichi. Alexander Vovin instead proposes that Mùgúlǘ (木骨閭), in reconstructed Middle Chinese *muwk-kwot-ljo, transcribed Tuoba Xianbei *moqo-lo ~ muqo-lo 'bald head', which is analysable as 'one [who/]which has cut off/fallen off [hair]' and cognate with Mongolic lexical items like  (Written Mongolian moɣutur ~ moqutur 'blunt, hornless, bald tail' (cf. Chinese gloss as 禿尾 'bald tail'), moqu-ɣar, Middle Mongol  'hornless', moqo-dag 'blunt'; all of those are from Proto-Mongolic *muqu 'to be cut off, break off, fall off', which in turn would produce the semantic variation 'blunt ~ hornless ~ hairless ~ bald').

Clan name 

According to the Book of Wei, the dynasty founded by Mugulü's descendants  was called Yujiulü, which sound superficially like Mugulü, and thus the Yujiulü clan (郁久閭氏, reconstructed Middle Chinese: ʔjuk kjǝu ljwo) emerged. Róna-Tas suggested that Yujiulü rendered *ugur(i) > Uğur, a secondary form of Oğur.; Peter B. Golden additionally proposed connection with Turkic uğurluğ "feasible, opportune", later "auspicious fortunate" or oğrï "thief", an etymology more suited to the dynasty's founder's activities; additionally Yujiulü may be comparable to Middle Mongolian uğuli "owl" (> Khalkha ууль uul'''), as personal names based on bird names are common in Mongolic.

 See also 
Yujiulü Shelun
Yujiulü Anagui
Yujiulü Dengshuzi
Tuoba Liwei
Tuoba clan
Xianbei
Rourans

 Succession 

 

 References 

 Notes 

 Citations 

 Further reading 

 Beishi vol. 98 section "Ruru"
 Weishu'' vol. 103

Khagans of the Rouran
Rouran
Donghu people
Mongolian nobility
Founding monarchs
Place of death unknown
4th-century Chinese monarchs
Legendary Chinese people
Tengrist monarchs
Mongol mythology
Sixteen Kingdoms nobility
Sixteen Kingdoms rulers
Self-proclaimed monarchy
Chinese escapees